Notofairchildia is a genus of moth flies in the subfamily Bruchomyiinae.  Species have been recorded principally from South America, with many, including the type, transferred from the genus Nemopalpus.

Species
Unless referenced otherwise, Systema Dipterorum includes:
Notofairchildia acaenohybos (Quate & Alexander, 2000)
Notofairchildia amazonensis (Wagner & Stuckenberg, 2012)
Notofairchildia australiensis (Alexander, 1928)
Notofairchildia brejetubensis (Santos, 2009)
Notofairchildia brevinervis (Barretto & Andretta, 1946)
Notofairchildia cancer (Wagner & Stuckenberg, 2012)
Notofairchildia dissimilis (Barretto & Andretta, 1946)
Notofairchildia espiritosantoensis (Santos, 2009)
Notofairchildia glyphanos (Curler, 2012)
Notofairchildia immaculatus (Freeman, 1949)
Notofairchildia phoenimimos (Quate & Alexander, 2000)
Notofairchildia rondanica (Quate & Alexander, 2000)
Notofairchildia spinosus (Bravo & Barata, 2012)
Notofairchildia stenygros (Quate & Alexander, 2000)
Notofairchildia stuckenbergi (Wagner, 2012)
Notofairchildia zelandiae (Alexander, 1921)

References

External Links
 
 
 Catalogue of Life listing (retrieved 3 July 2021)

Nematocera genera
Diptera of South America
Taxa named by Brian Roy Stuckenberg
Psychodidae